Baladas en Español is a Spanish language compilation album by Swedish pop duo Roxette, released on 21 October 1996 by EMI. The compilation was only issued in Spanish and Portuguese-speaking territories. It was a commercial success upon release, peaking in the top ten of several national record charts, and was certified gold or platinum in numerous territories, namely Argentina, Brazil, Mexico and Spain. As of 2001, the record sold in excess of 1.2 million copies worldwide.

"Un Día Sin Ti" and "No Sé Si Es Amor" were released as commercial singles, though most songs on the album would go on to receive substantial amounts of airplay on Latin American and Spanish radio. In 2022, a complete collection of the record was released, consisting of all the Spanish language songs recorded by Roxette.

Composition and style
The album consists of twelve of Roxette's ballads and downtempo tracks, translated into Spanish by songwriter Luis Gomez Escolar, of whom very little is known. Escolar's translations have been criticised by both fans and media for being poorly representative of the original English lyrics, as well as for being overly-simplistic and juvenile.

Commercial performance
Baladas en Español was released on 21 October 1996, exclusively in Spanish and Portuguese-speaking territories. However, it was also released in the US by EMI Latin, making it the final Roxette album to be officially issued in the country. The record was preceded by the release of "Un Día Sin Ti" as its lead single, which reached the top ten of Billboards Latin Pop Songs. The song also charted on the national airplay charts of Spain and Poland. Its music video was directed by Jonas Åkerlund. "No Sé Si Es Amor" was released as the album's second and final single in January 1997, peaking at number six in Spain. "Soy una Mujer" was released as a promotional single exclusively in Mexico in July 1997.

The album was a commercial success upon release, and has been certified double platinum in Spain (indicating shipments of over 200,000 units), platinum in Argentina and Brazil (for 60,000 and 250,000 copies, respectively), and gold (100,000 copies) in Mexico. As of 2001, Baladas en Español has sold over 1.2 million copies worldwide, and just over 13,000 copies in the US.

Track listing

Personnel
Credits adapted from the liner notes of Baladas en Español.
 Roxette are Per Gessle and Marie Fredriksson
 Recorded at Tits & Ass Studio in Halmstad, Sweden; EMI Studios and Polar Studios in Stockholm, Sweden; Mayfair Studios in London, England and Capri Digital Studios in Capri, Italy between 1987 and 1996.
 All songs published by Jimmy Fun Music, except: "Watercolours in the Rain" published by Shock the Music/Jimmy Fun Music 
 All songs produced by Clarence Öfwerman
 Mastered by Alar Suurna at Polar Studios
 
Musicians
 Marie Fredriksson – lead and background vocals
 Per Gessle – lead and background vocals, mixing
 Pelle Alsing – drums
 Bo Eriksson – oboe 
 Anders Herrlin – bass guitar, programming, engineering
 Jonas Isacsson – acoustic and electric guitars
 Christer Jansson – drums
 Clarence Öfwerman – keyboards and production; string arrangements and conducting 
 Kjell Öhman – accordion 
 Mats "M.P." Persson – acoustic and electric guitars
 Pelle Sirén – acoustic and electric guitars

Technical
 Kjell Andersson – sleeve design
 Kevin Davies – photography
 Mats Holmquist – string arrangements and conducting 
 Michael Ilbert – engineering, mixing
 Henrik Jansson – string arrangements and conducting 
 Jonas Linell – photography
 Lars Nordin – photography
 Alar Suurna – engineering

Charts

Certifications

!scope="row"|Worldwide
|
|1,200,000
|-

References

External links

1996 albums
Roxette albums
Spanish-language compilation albums
EMI Records compilation albums